The Liberal Union–Brătianu (UL–B) was a political party in Romania.

History
The UL–B contested the 1990 general elections, receiving around 0.3% of the vote in both the Chamber of Deputies elections and the Senate elections. Although it failed to win a seat in the Senate, the party won one seat in the Chamber, taken by Ion I. Bratiănu. Despite increasing its vote share to 0.5% in the 1992 elections, the party lost its single seat.

The 2000 general elections saw the party receive just 3,760 votes (0.03%), again failing to win a seat. The party dissolved in 2003 after failing to re-register with the party register.

Electoral history

Legislative elections

References

Defunct political parties in Romania